Norape argyrorrhoea is a moth of the Megalopygidae family. It was described by Jacob Hübner in 1825. It is found in Argentina, Trinidad, Brazil, Guyana, Venezuela, Paraguay, Panama, Costa Rica and Mexico.

The wingspan is about 24 mm for males and 30 mm for females. Adults are white, with a faint creamy tint. The pectus and femora are smoky black and the antennae testaceous.

References

Moths described in 1825
Megalopygidae